This is a list of cemeteries in Canada, posted by province or territory.

Alberta
 Alto Reste Cemetery, Red Deer - George Allen
 Beechmount Cemetery, Edmonton - Hank Smith
 Blackfoot Crossing Cemetery, Cluny - Crowfoot
 Calgary Union Cemetery, Calgary - Peter Lougheed, Herbert Greenfield, Red Dutton, Dutch Gainor
 Edmonton Municipal Cemetery, Edmonton - Howard Blatchford, Kenny Blatchford, Ambrose Bury, Dan Knott, John W. Leedy, Sidney Parsons, William Short, Richard Gavin ReidWop May
 Elnora Cemetery, Elnora - Alexander Picton Brereton
Holy Cross Cemetery, Edmonton.  Burial site for Edmonton Oilers founder William "Wild Bill" Hunter, and Canadian Football League players Johnny Bright and Rollie Miles.
 Lougheed Cemetery, Lougheed - Cecil John Kinross
 Okotoks Cemetery, Okotoks - Max Bell
 Queens Park Cemetery and Mausoleum, Calgary - Hank Bassen, Owen Hart
 Rosehill Cemetery, Edmonton - Don Getty
 St. Mary's Catholic Cemetery, Cochrane - Frank McCool
 St. Mary's Ukrainian Catholic Cemetery, Chipman - Wasyl Eleniak
Temple Hill (Warner County, Alberta), cemetery owned by the town of Raymond
 Viking Cemetery - Viking - Clem Loughlin

British Columbia
 Burrard Cemetery, North Vancouver - Chief Dan George
Forest Lawn Memorial Park (Burnaby) - William Aberhart, Fred Hume, Amby Moran
 Fraser Cemetery, New Westminster - Raymond Burr, Cyrus Wesley Peck
 Kelowna Municipal Cemetery, Kelowna - Bill Bennett, W. A. C. Bennett, Ray Powell
Mountain View Cemetery. The oldest cemetery in the city of Vancouver, it is the resting place of 145,000 people, including numerous notable figures in the city's history.
 Ocean View Burial Park, Burnaby - Tommy Burns, Michael Cuccione, Miles Mander, Charles Merritt, Roy Conacher, Thomas Dufferin Pattullo
 Port Coquitlam Municipal Cemetery, Port Coquitlam  - Terry Fox
Ross Bay Cemetery, Victoria. Final resting place of Sir James Douglas, Emily Carr, Billy Barker and Sir Matthew Baillie Begbie, the "Hanging Judge".

Manitoba
 All Saints Cemetery, Winnipeg - Nicholas Mickoski
 Brookside Cemetery, Winnipeg
 Elmwood Cemetery, Winnipeg - Joe Cooper, Dufferin Roblin
 Greenwood Cemetery, Carman - Jim McFadden
 Hillside Cemetery, Portage la Prairie - Robert F. Dodd, Ross King, Bryan Hextall
St. Boniface Cathedral Cemetery, Winnipeg. Burial site of Louis Riel.  Oldest graveyard in Western Canada.
 St. Vital Cemetery, Winnipeg - Eddie Mazur

New Brunswick
Fernhill Cemetery, Saint John - Sir Samuel Leonard Tilley, Ward Chipman, Amos Edwin Botsford
 Forest Hill Cemetery, Fredericton - Bliss Carman, Alden Nowlan, Charles Dow Richards, Charles G. D. Roberts
 Greenwood Cemetery, Hartland - Richard Hatfield
 St. Albans Cemetery, Bathurst - Herman James Good

Newfoundland and Labrador 

 Anglican Burial Ground, Cathedral of St. John the Baptist, St. John's - James Pearl
 General Protestant Cemetery, St. John's -  Isabella Whiteford Rogerson

Northwest Territories
Back Bay Cemetery, Yellowknife

Nova Scotia
Camp Hill Cemetery, Halifax. Burial site for Joseph Howe, Robert Stanfield, Abraham Gesner, Viola Desmond
Fairview Cemetery, Halifax. Many victims of the RMS Titanic sinking.
Garrison Cemetery, Annapolis Royal, Nova Scotia, The oldest English tomb stone in all of Canada, 1720 CE; though the cemetery was est. 1605.
 Gates of Heaven Cemetery, Lower Sackville - Marty Barry, Denny Doherty, Angus L. Macdonald, Don Messer, Dave Trottier
Holy Cross Cemetery, Halifax. Burial site for Sir John Sparrow David Thompson, Prime Minister of Canada 
Mount Olivet Cemetery, Halifax.  Nineteen victims of the sinking of RMS Titanic are buried here.
Nictaux Community Centre Cemetery, Nictaux, The oldest cemetery in Nictaux, with soldiers from the Siege of Quebec
Old Burying Ground, Halifax - Richard Smith

Ontario
 African Cemetery, Essex - Delos Rogest Davis
 Assumption Catholic Cemetery, Mississauga - Joe Primeau, Marc Diab
 Aurora Cemetery, Aurora - John W. Bowser
 Avondale Cemetery, Stratford - Patrick Crean, Dolly Dolson, William Hutt, Richard Manuel and, Richard Jean Monette
 Beechwood Cemetery, Ottawa – Robert Borden, Tommy Douglas, Sandford Fleming, Andrew McNaughton
 Beechwood Cemetery, Vaughan - Eric Clavering 
 Belleville Cemetery, Belleville - Susanna Moodie, Sir Mackenzie Bowell, Davie Kerr, Albert Holway
 Burlington Memorial Gardens, Burlington - Leslie Mahaffy
 Cataraqui Cemetery, Kingston – Alexander Campbell, John A. Macdonald
 Chatham-Kent, nearby, the Hutberg, God's Acre burial ground of the Christian Munsee New Fairfield/Moraviantown
 Colborne Union Cemetery, Colborne - Charles Smith Rutherford
 Dixie Union Chapel and Cemetery, Mississauga - Thomas Laird Kennedy
 Drummond Hill Cemetery, Niagara Falls - Laura Secord, Karel Soucek
 Elmira Mennonite Cemetery, Elmira - Daniel Snyder
 Elmira Union Cemetery, Elmira - Waldo Von Erich
 Erin Cemetery, Erin - Tom Connors
 Fairview Cemetery, Listowel - George Hay, Andrew Edward McKeever
 Fairview Cemetery, Niagara Falls - Ralph Bowman, Bill Cupolo
 Forest Lawn Mausoleum, Toronto - Arthur Jeffrey Dempster, Morden Neilson, Henry Pellatt, Domenic Troiano
 Forest Lawn Memorial Gardens, London - Charley Fox
 Glendale Memorial  Gardens, Toronto - Barry Ashbee, Turk Broda 
 Greenwood Cemetery, Owen Sound  - Billy Bishop, Lela Brooks, David Vivian Currie, Thomas William Holmes and, Harry Lumley
 Greenwood Cemetery, Sault Ste. Marie - Wayne Maki
 Hamilton Cemetery, Hamilton. The traditional burial site of the mayors of Hamilton.
 Heavenly Rest Catholic Cemetery, Windsor - Charles Leo Nelligan, Andy Bellemer, Real Chevrefils, Marcel Pronovost
 Highland Park Cemetery, Peterborough - Les Ascott, Paul O'Sullivan
 Holy Cross Catholic Cemetery, Brantford - Bryan Fogarty
  Holy Cross Catholic Cemetery, Markham - Philip Francis Pocock, Gerald Emmett Carter, Aloysius Ambrozic, Marshall McLuhan, Jack Tunney, Carl Brewer , Charles Sauriol, Milt Dunnell, Domenic Racco, Emanuel Jaques
 Holy Sepulchre Catholic Cemetery, Burlington - Victor Copps, Sir Allan Napier MacNab, John McGovern (VC), Jim Quondamatteo , Ralph Sazio, Papalia crime family , Musitano crime family, Paul Francis Reding
 Keewaywin Cemetery, Kenora - Norval Morrisseau
 King City Cemetery, King City - Rod Smylie
 Lakeview Cemetery, Sarnia - Alexander Mackenzie
 Lakeview Cemetery, Thorold - Lorne Duguid
 Laurel Hill Cemetery, Caledon - Keith McCreary
 Little Lake Cemetery, Peterborough - Frank Buckland, Isabella Valancy Crawford, Iva Campbell Fallis
 Maple Cemetery, Vaughan - Paisley Maxwell
 Marymount Catholic Cemetery, Guelph - Lou Fontinato
 McMichael Art Collection Burial Grounds, Vaughan - A. J. Casson, Lawren Harris, A. Y. Jackson, Frank Johnston, Arthur Lismer, Frederick Varley, Franklin Carmichael
 Mohawk Chapel Cemetery, Brantford - Joseph Brant
 Mount Hope Cemetery, Kitchener - Pvt. Buckam Singh, Fr. David Bauer
 Mount Hope Catholic Cemetery in Toronto. The burial site for Margaret Anglin, Morley Callaghan, King Clancy.
 Mount Pleasant Cemetery, Toronto. Those interred there include Timothy Eaton, Frederick Banting, Glenn Gould, William Lyon Mackenzie King.
 Necropolis Cemetery, in Toronto. (Toronto Necropolis) – Ned Hanlan, William Lyon Mackenzie, George A. Romero
 Notre Dame Cemetery, Ottawa. Yousuf Karsh, Sir Wilfrid Laurier and Aurèle Joliat.
 Oshawa Union Cemetery, Oshawa – Gordon Daniel Conant, Ross Lowe and, Samuel McLaughlin
 Pardes Chaim Cemetery, Vaughan – Cayle Chernin, Adam Litovitz, Max Haines
 Pardes Shalom Cemetery, Vaughan – Harvey Atkin, Corey Haim, Al Waxman, Harry Rasky, Ed Mirvish. Barbara Frum, Marvin Goldhar, Phyllis Gotlieb 
 Park Lawn Cemetery, Toronto – Jeff Healey, Lou Marsh, Conn Smythe, Stanley Frolick, Jack Marks
 Pinecrest Cemetery, Ottawa - George G. Blackburn, George Brancato, Gordie Bruce, Harry Connor, Cy Denneny
 Pine Hills Cemetery, Toronto - John McLellan, Nels Stewart, Joseph Harcourt Tombs, Roy Worters and, Peter Zezel
 Pleasantview Memorial Gardens, Thorold - Kristen French
 Prospect Cemetery, Toronto - Colin Fraser Barron, Wes Cutler, Jake Forbes, JEH MacDonald and, Walter Leigh Rayfield
 Queen of Heaven Catholic Cemetery, Vaughan – Tony Rosato
 Queenston Heights Monument, Niagara-on-the-Lake - Sir Isaac Brock
 Resurrection Catholic Cemetery, Whitby - John McCormack, Mickey Roach , Billy Taylor
 Riverside Cemetery, Lindsay - Leslie Frost, Ray Timgren, Dennis Buckley
 Riverside Cemetery, Toronto - Rob Ford, Ed Litzenberger
 Sacred Heart Cemetery, North Bay - Dionne Quintuplets
 Sanctuary Park Cemetery, Toronto - Jimmy Fowler, Victor Kugler, Frederick George Topham
 Stouffville Cemetery, Stouffville - Kevin O'Shea
 St. Andrew's West Cemetery, Cornwall - John Sandfield Macdonald
 St. Columba's Cemetery, Pembroke - Frank Nighbor, Bishops for the Diocese of Pembroke
 St. Mark's Cemetery, Port Hope - Vincent Massey
 St. Mary's Cemetery, St. Marys - Arthur Meighen
 St. Mary's Catholic Cemetery, Barrie - Dan Maloney
 St. Patrick's Cemetery, Lucan - Bridget Donnelly
 St. Thomas Cemetery, St. Thomas - Mitchell Hepburn
 St. Volodymyr Ukrainian Cemetery, Oakville – Gregory Hines, Negrita Jayde, Ulas Samchuk, Roman Danylak
 Thornbury-Clarksburg Union Cemetery, Thornbury - Cecil Dillon
 Timmins Memorial Cemetery, Timmins - Bill Barilko, Armand Delmonte
 Trafalgar Lawn Cemetery, Oakville - Jimmy Tapp
 Victoria Lawn Cemetery, St. Catharines - Pete Neumann, Tammy Homolka, Arthur Schmon, William Hamilton Merritt
 West Korah Cemetery, Sault Ste. Marie - William Merrifield
 Willowbank Cemetery, Gananoque - Mary Wiseman See
 Woodland Cemetery, Kitchener - John Metz Schneider, Babe Siebert, George Hainsworth, Bobby Kuntz, Bobby Bauer
 Woodland Cemetery, London - Frank Colman, George Prodgers
 Woodlawn Memorial Park, Guelph - George A. Drew
 York Cemetery, in Toronto. The burial site of Grand Duchess Olga Alexandrovna of Russia, and her husband Captain Kolikovsky, and Tim Horton.
 List of cemeteries in York Region

Quebec
 Mount Royal Cemetery, Montreal – John Abbott, Frank Calder, John Molson, Howie Morenz, Mordecai Richler
 National Field of Honour, Pointe-Claire, an official veteran's cemetery
 Cimetière Notre-Dame-de-Belmont, (formerly Sainte-Foy) Quebec City. Politicians Louis-Alexandre Taschereau and Jean Lesage.
 Notre Dame des Neiges Cemetery, Montreal. Maurice Richard, George-Étienne Cartier, Doug Harvey, Pierre Laporte.
 Mount Hermon Cemetery, (formerly Sillery) Sillery Heritage Site, Quebec City. There are more than  interments, including some who perished on the Empress of Ireland. Also: Henri-Gustave Joly de Lotbinière, Frank Carrel, Joseph Morrin, Bartholomew Gugy, and William Wood.  
 St. Thomas Aquinas Cemetery, Compton - Louis St. Laurent

Saskatchewan
Estevan City Cemetery, Estevan
Hillcrest Cemetery, Weyburn
Moose Jaw City Cemetery, Moose Jaw
Nutana Pioneer Cemetery, Saskatoon
Prince Albert Memorial Gardens, Prince Albert
Rainton Cemetery, Weyburn
Regina Memorial Gardens, Regina
Riverside Memorial Park Cemetery, Regina
Rosedale Cemetery, Moose Jaw
South Hill Cemetery, Prince Albert
Stoughton Cemetery, Stoughton
Woodlawn Cemetery, Saskatoon
Yorkton City Cemetery, Yorkton
 Alingly Cemetery ~ Spruce Home, Saskatchewan

External links
 Find a grave in Canada